Morgan Valley is a former American basketball player,  former head coach of the Hartford Hawks women's basketball team, and current assistant coach for the UConn Huskies basketball team.

Playing career

High school
A two-time Vermont Miss Basketball selection by the Burlington Free Press, Valley guided Rice Memorial High School to two-straight undefeated seasons and two Division I girls state championships.

College
Valley attended the University of Connecticut and played basketball for Hall of Fame coach Geno Auriemma from 2000-2004. As a member of three national championship squads, and the 2001–02 undefeated team, Valley appeared in 108 games.

University of Connecticut statistics

Coaching career
After graduation, Valley spent one season as a student assistant with the Huskies before taking her first full-time coaching position at Holy Cross. After assistant coaching stops at New Hampshire and Towson, Valley had a four year stint as assistant coach under Sharon Dawley at UMass. After an assistant coaching stop at Virginia Tech, Valley joined the coaching staff at Washington where she was part of the Huskies 2016 Final Four run. 

From 2017 to 2019, Valley was on staff at Arizona, until April 19, 2019 when she was named the ninth head coach in Hartford history, replacing Kim McNeill, who accepted a similar position at East Carolina.

On April 21, 2021, it was announced that Valley would be returning to UConn as an assistant coach replacing Shea Ralph.

Head coaching record

References

External links
 Official Biography, UConn Huskies

Living people
1982 births
American women's basketball coaches
Hartford Hawks women's basketball coaches
Arizona Wildcats women's basketball coaches
Washington Huskies women's basketball coaches
UMass Minutewomen basketball coaches
Towson Tigers women's basketball coaches
Virginia Tech Hokies women's basketball coaches
New Hampshire Wildcats women's basketball coaches
Holy Cross Crusaders women's basketball coaches
UConn Huskies women's basketball players
Basketball players from Vermont
Basketball coaches from Vermont
People from Colchester, Vermont